Matt Weingart (born 26 June 1982 in Canada) was a Canadian rugby union player. His playing position was scrum-half. He was named in the Canada squad for the 2007 Rugby World Cup, although he did not make any appearances in the tournament. He though did make 7 international appearances for Canada between 2004 and 2007, before starting the sports clothing brand Dryworld.

Reference list

External links
itsrugby.co.uk profile

1982 births
Canadian rugby union players
Canada international rugby union players
Living people
Rugby union scrum-halves
People from the Cariboo Regional District